The 1981–82 Drexel Dragons men's basketball team represented Drexel University  during the 1981–82 NCAA Division I men's basketball season. The Dragons, led by 5th year head coach Eddie Burke, played their home games at the Daskalakis Athletic Center and were members of the East Coast Conference (ECC).

The team finished the season 19–11, and finished in 4th place in the ECC East in the regular season.

Roster

Schedule

|-
!colspan=9 style="background:#F8B800; color:#002663;"| Regular season
|-

|-
!colspan=12 style="background:#FFC600; color:#07294D;"| ECC Tournament
|-

Awards
Randy Burkert
ECC All-Conference Second Team

Charles Hickman
ECC All-Rookie Team

References

Drexel Dragons men's basketball seasons
Drexel
1981 in sports in Pennsylvania
1982 in sports in Pennsylvania